The Sándor Bródy Prize is a Hungarian literary award founded in 1995 by Alexander Brody, a :Hungarian American,
in honor of his grandfather, the Hungarian writer Sándor Bródy. It is given annually, for the best first novel of the year. It carries a monetary award, and financial assistance to the publication of the second novel of the author.

Winners
1995: Simon Balázs, Szilasi László
1996: Hamvai Kornél
1997: Péter Farkas, Salamon András
1998: Zoltán Gábor
1999: Ajtony Árpád
2000: Jusztin Harsona
2001: Szálinger Balázs
2002: Krisztián Grecsó
2003: György Dragomán
2004: Murányi Zita and Nagy Gabriella
2005: Gazdag József
2006: Szakács István
2007: Harcos Bálint
2008: Dunajcsik Mátyás
2009: Peter Huncik
2010: Angi Máté
2011: Edina Szvoren 
2012: Gabor Kálmán

Sources
 Bárkaonline
 Könyvesblog
 HHRF
 Litera

Hungarian literary awards
Awards established in 1995